Glyphodes aniferalis is a moth in the family Crambidae. It was described by George Hampson in 1909. It is found in South Africa and Uganda.

References

Moths described in 1909
Glyphodes